Break-through is a 2006 Russian war drama film directed by Vitaliy Lukin.

Plot 
The film takes place during the anti-terrorist operation in Chechnya in 2000. The Russian army is looking for gangs hiding in the mountains. One reconnaissance group engages in a battle with a detachment of militants. But the battle will be very difficult.

Cast 
 Ildus Abrahmanov
 Andrey Abramov
 Andrei Bogdanov as Ivolgin
 Anton Borisov as Mytarin
 Oleg Stefan as Col. Gen. Selivanov (as Oleg Shtefanko)
 Igor Lifanov as Capt. Fyodor Stozharov

References

External links 
 

2006 films
2000s Russian-language films
Russian war drama films
2000s war drama films